The American Association of Colleges for Teacher Education (AACTE) is a nonprofit national alliance of education programs, which is dedicated to professional development of Pre-K-12 teachers and school leaders.

AACTE has 800 member institutions, which are both public and private colleges and universities across the United States.

External links
AACTE web site - www.aacte.org

References

Educational organizations based in the United States